Alexander Mikhailevich Makritski (born 11 August 1971 in Minsk) is a Belarusian professional ice hockey defenceman and coach.

Career 
During his career, Makritski played hockey in Belarus, Germany, and Russia. He also participated in the 2010 IIHF World Championship as a member of the Belarus National men's ice hockey team. In 2019, he became the head coach of Yunost Minsk.

Career statistics

Regular season and playoffs

International

References

External links
 

1971 births
Living people
Ice hockey players at the 2002 Winter Olympics
Ice hockey players at the 2010 Winter Olympics
Olympic ice hockey players of Belarus
Ice hockey people from Minsk
HC Dinamo Minsk players
Avangard Omsk players

Belarusian ice hockey defencemen
Ice hockey defencemen
Belarusian ice hockey coaches